K102 or K-102 may refer to:

K-102 (Kansas highway), a state highway in Kansas
KEEY-FM, a radio station